The 2012 Hampton Pirates football team represented Hampton University in the 2012 NCAA Division I FCS football season. They were led by fourth year head coach Donovan Rose and played their home games at Armstrong Stadium. They are a member of the Mid-Eastern Athletic Conference. They finished the season 3–7, 3–5 in MEAC play to finish the season in eighth place.

Schedule

Source: Schedule

References

Hampton
Hampton Pirates football seasons
Hampton Pirates football